Dougie is a pet form (hypocorism) of the given names Dougal and Douglas. 

People:
Dougie Brown (born 1969), former Scottish cricketer
Dougie Donnelly (born 1953), Scottish television broadcaster
Dougie Freedman (born 1974), former Scottish professional football player
Dougie Hall (born 1980), rugby union footballer
Dougie Hamilton (born 1993), Canadian ice hockey player
Dougie Lampkin (born 1976), English motorcycle trials rider
Dougie Lockhart (born 1976), Scottish cricketer
Dougie MacLean (born 1954), singer-songwriter, composer and multi-instrumentalist
Dougie McDonald (born 1965), Scottish football referee
Dougie Payne (born 1972), bassist and backing vocalist
Dougie Poynter (born 1987), English musician
Dougie Thomson (born 1951), bass guitarist
Dougie Vipond (born 1966), Scottish musician and television personality
Dougie Walker (born 1973), Scottish sprinter

Fictional characters:
Dougie Slade, in the TV series EastEnders
Dougie (South Park), from the TV series South Park

References

Anglicised Scottish Gaelic-language given names
English masculine given names
Scottish masculine given names
Hypocorisms